is a railway station in Shimada, Shizuoka Prefecture, Japan, operated by Central Japan Railway Company (JR Tōkai).

Lines
Rokugō Station is served by the Tōkaidō Main Line, and is located 204.9 kilometers from the starting point of the line at Tokyo Station.

Station layout
The station has two opposing side platforms serving Track 1 and Track 2 which are on headshunts, allowing for tracks for express trains to pass in between. The platforms are connected by an elevated station building built over the tracks. The station building has automated ticket machines, TOICA automated turnstiles and a staffed ticket office.

Platforms

Adjacent stations

|-
!colspan=5|Central Japan Railway Company

Station history
Rokugō Station was opened on April 26, 1986 in response to requests from the local Shimada city government.

Station numbering was introduced to the section of the Tōkaidō Line operated JR Central in March 2018; Rokugō Station was assigned station number CA23.

Passenger statistics
In fiscal 2017, the station was used by an average of 3095 passengers daily (boarding passengers only).

Surrounding area
 Rokugō Junior High School
Shimada Technical High School

See also
 List of Railway Stations in Japan

References

Yoshikawa, Fumio. Tokaido-sen 130-nen no ayumi. Grand-Prix Publishing (2002) .

External links

  

Railway stations in Japan opened in 1986
Railway stations in Shizuoka Prefecture
Tōkaidō Main Line
Stations of Central Japan Railway Company
Shimada, Shizuoka